Siparuna piloso-lepidota is a species of plant in the Siparunaceae family. It is endemic to Ecuador.

References

Flora of Ecuador
Siparunaceae
Near threatened plants
Taxonomy articles created by Polbot